Si Thep is the southernmost district (amphoe) of Phetchabun province, Thailand, in the valley of the Pa Sak River. Si Thep, now on a tentative list of UN World Heritage Sites, is Thailand's largest ancient city.

History

The district was created on 13 December 1970 as a minor district (king amphoe) with territory from Wichian Buri district. It was upgraded to Si Thep District on 8 August 1976.

The ancient city of Si Thep was built in the Dvaravati era. Prince Damrong found the area of the old city in 1905 when he visited Monthon Phetchabun. It is now Si Thep Historical Park.

Geography
Si Thep is on a dry highland surrounded by waterways and floodplains bordered by mountains on both sides. To ensure sufficient water for city use, ancient Si Thep had an elaborate system of ponds, tank moats, and a hydraulic system to bring water from higher grounds to sustain the city.

Neighboring districts are (from the north clockwise) Wichian Buri of Phetchabun Province, and Lam Sonthi, Chai Badan, and Khok Charoen of Lopburi province.

Administration
The district is divided into seven sub-districts (tambons), which are further subdivided into 93 villages (mubans). The township (thesaban tambon) Sawang Watthana  covers parts of tambon Sa Kruat. There are seven tambon administrative organizations (TAO).

References

External links
Si Thep Historical Park by Finearts

Si Thep
Dvaravati